In 2014 Mikael Klitgaard, from Venstre, became mayor of Brønderslev Municipality. He was re-elected in 2017, despite losing 2.5% of the vote and 1 seat. However, Venstre increased their vote share by 5.8%, and gained 2 seats for this election. On 19 November, Mikael Klitgaard secured a 3rd period as mayor, after a constitution was agreed upon by Venstre, Conservatives, The New Right, Borgerlisten  and Danish People's Party.

Electoral system
For elections to Danish municipalities, a number varying from 9 to 31 are chosen to be elected to the municipal council. The seats are then allocated using the D'Hondt method and a closed list proportional representation.
Brønderslev Municipality had 27 seats in 2021

Unlike in Danish General Elections, in elections to municipal councils, electoral alliances are allowed.

Electoral alliances  

Electoral Alliance 1

Electoral Alliance 2

Electoral Alliance 3

Electoral Alliance 4

Results

Notes

References 

Brønderslev